Carrascosa del Campo is a town in the municipality of Campos del Paraíso, with a population of 602 (2007 census). It is located in the area called Mancha Alta y Sierra Media, in the Province of Cuenca, part of the autonomous community of Castile-La Mancha in Spain.

Populated places in the Province of Cuenca
Localities of Spain